"Ain't Sayin' Nothin'" is the second single from Fat Joe's album The Elephant in the Room. It also has a sample of Cocababy at the end of the video. The song features Plies and Dre. Lil Wayne, Ace Hood, Rocko, DJ Khaled, Rick Ross, Cool (of Cool & Dre), Birdman, Danja & Pitbull made appearances in the video. The song peaked at number 93 on the US Hot R&B/Hip-Hop Songs chart.

Remix
The official remix was made, featuring rappers The Game and Lil Wayne with a new verse by Fat Joe himself and Dre still on the chorus. In the remix, Fat Joe mocks his rival, G-Unit rapper 50 Cent, by saying, "You heard Game his enemies' my enemy Young Buck callin me say he wanna be a friend of me." This is in reference to both The Game and Young Buck leaving G-Unit.

Charts

References

2008 singles
Fat Joe songs
Plies (rapper) songs
Cool & Dre songs
Song recordings produced by Cool & Dre
2008 songs
Imperial Records singles
Songs written by Fat Joe
Songs written by Dre (record producer)
Songs written by Cool (record producer)
Songs written by Plies (rapper)